The 2013 Seve Trophy by Golf+, the eighth edition of the Seve Trophy, was played 3–6 October at Golf de Saint-Nom-la-Bretèche in France. The team captain for Great Britain and Ireland was Sam Torrance, while the captain for Continental Europe was José María Olazábal. The contest took place at the same time as the 2013 Presidents Cup, unlike 2009 and 2011 when it was scheduled during the PGA Tour's FedEx Cup playoffs. Continental Europe won the tournament by 15 to 13, their first victory since 2000.

Format
The teams will compete over four days with five fourball matches on both Thursday and Friday, four foursomes matches on Saturday morning, a further four foursomes matches on Saturday afternoon and ten singles matches on Sunday. This means that a total of 28 points are available with 14½ points required for victory. This will be the first Seve Trophy without any greensome matches.

The total prize fund will be €1,750,000.

Teams
The teams are made up of five leading players from the Official World Golf Ranking as of 23 September 2013 and five leading players (not otherwise qualified) from the Race to Dubai at the conclusion of the Italian Open (22 September 2013). There were a number of players (listed after each table below) who qualified for the trophy, but pulled out.

Gonzalo Fernández-Castaño was a late replacement for Peter Hanson who withdrew from the Continental Europe team with a back injury. Hanson had qualified as one of the leading 5 players in the World Rankings (world ranked 39). After his withdrawal his place amongst the World Rankings qualifiers was taken by Nicolas Colsaerts who had previously qualified through the Race to Dubai list. Colsaerts' place in the Race to Dubai list was taken by Fernández-Castaño.

The following players qualified but did not play: Justin Rose (world ranking - 5), Rory McIlroy (6), Graeme McDowell (11), Luke Donald (15), Lee Westwood (18), Ian Poulter (20) and Martin Laird (59).

The following players qualified but did not play: Henrik Stenson (world ranking - 4), Sergio García (17), Jonas Blixt (35) and Martin Kaymer (42).

Thursday fourballs
3 October 2013

Source:

Friday fourballs
4 October 2013

Source:

Saturday foursomes 
5 October 2013

Morning 

Source:

Afternoon 

Source:

Sunday singles
6 October 2013

Simon Khan had to pull out of the event through to injury. Under the rules of the event a half was agreed, while Thomas Bjørn sat out the singles.

Source:

References

External links
Coverage on European Tour's official site

Seve Trophy
Golf tournaments in France
International sports competitions hosted by Paris
Seve Trophy
Seve Trophy
Seve Trophy